David L. DiLaura (Boulder, Colorado) is an American engineer, educator and pioneer in lighting calculation software.

He received his Bachelor of Science in physics from Wayne State University in Detroit in 1970, after which he worked for 10 years as an illuminating engineer at the architectural engineering firm of Smith, Hinchman & Grylls. During this time he was also visiting lecturer in illuminating engineering at the University of Colorado at Boulder, where he taught for the first time in 1972.

In 1981 he founded Lighting Technologies, Inc. in Boulder, Colorado, where he directed the development of Lumen Micro. At the same time he was appointed Associate Professor Adjunct of Architectural Engineering in the College of Engineering at University of Colorado, and established its lighting education program. He was appointed Senior Instructor at University of Colorado in January 1994, and gave up daily management responsibilities at Lighting Technologies. He was Professor and Associate Chair for Architectural Engineering at the University of Colorado. In 2007, after 27 years of teaching, he retired from the university and joined Acuity Brands as Principal Illuminating Engineer.

DiLaura is a Fellow and Gold Medalist of the Illuminating Engineering Society, a Fellow of the American Association for the Advancement of Science, a member of Tau Beta Pi, and has his LC. He has been topic editor of the 8th and 9th editions of the IES Lighting Handbook and editor of the 10th edition, he has published 42 technical papers, a translation and analysis of Johann Lambert's seminal Latin work "Photometria", authored "A History of Light and Lighting", and for eight years was Editor-in-Chief of LEUKOS, the journal of the Illuminating Engineering Society.

He was inducted into the Architectural Lighting Hall of Fame in 2001, and was awarded an honorary doctorate from the University of Colorado in 2008.

Works

References

21st-century American engineers
Living people
People from Boulder, Colorado
Year of birth missing (living people)